Archibald Kennedy, 2nd Marquess of Ailsa, KT (25 August 1816 – 20 March 1870) was a Scottish peer and soldier.

Life 
Born at Dunottar, he was the eldest son of Archibald Kennedy, Earl of Cassilis, himself the oldest son of Archibald Kennedy, 1st Marquess of Ailsa, and his wife Eleanor, daughter of Alexander Allardyce. His father having predeceased him in 1832, Kennedy succeeded to his grandfather's titles in 1846. Eleanor as Marchioness was involved with Catharine Tait's Ladies Diocesan Association visiting the poor in the City Road Workhouse.

Kennedy served in the British Army as a lieutenant in the 17th Lancers (Duke of Cambridge's Own). Having been previously a Deputy Lieutenant, he was appointed Lord Lieutenant of Ayrshire in 1861, an office he held until his death nine years later.

Family
On 10 November 1846, Kennedy married Julia Jephson, daughter of Sir Richard Jephson, 1st Baronet, and had by her three sons and three daughters:

Archibald Kennedy, 3rd Marquess of Ailsa (1847–1938)
Lady Julia Alice Kennedy (1849–1936), who married Col. Robert William Web Follett. No known issue.
Lady Evelyn Anne Kennedy (1851–1936), married Capt. Sir Arthur Henderson Young, 17th Governor of the Straits Settlements. Left issue.
Lt.-Col. Lord Alexander Kennedy (1853–1912), who married Beatrice Gordon, daughter of George Tomline Gordon DL, JP. They had two daughters.
Lady Constance Eleanor Kennedy (1855–1946), married Col. Lionel Grimston Fawkes JP. They had issue.
Lt. Lord John Kennedy (1859–1895), who married Adelaide Mary Learmonth, daughter of Alexander Learmonth MP for Colchester. Left no issue.

References

External links

1816 births
1870 deaths
Knights of the Thistle
Lord-Lieutenants of Ayrshire
Archibald
Scottish people of Dutch descent
Schuyler family
Van Cortlandt family
2